Florian Gosch (born August 16, 1980) is a beach volleyball player from Austria.

He and teammate Nikolas Berger represented Austria at the 2004 Summer Olympics in Athens, Greece. Gosch and teammate Alexander Horst represented Austria at the 2008 Summer Olympics in Beijing, China.

References

External links
 
 
 
 
 

1980 births
Living people
Austrian beach volleyball players
Men's beach volleyball players
Beach volleyball players at the 2004 Summer Olympics
Beach volleyball players at the 2008 Summer Olympics
Olympic beach volleyball players of Austria